The Cheyenne are an Indigenous people of the Great Plains. Their Cheyenne language belongs to the Algonquian language family. Today, the Cheyenne people are split into two federally recognized nations: the Southern Cheyenne, who are enrolled in the Cheyenne and Arapaho Tribes in Oklahoma, and the Northern Cheyenne, who are enrolled in the Northern Cheyenne Tribe of the Northern Cheyenne Indian Reservation in Montana. The Cheyenne comprise two Native American tribes, the Só'taeo'o or Só'taétaneo'o (more commonly spelled as Suhtai or Sutaio) and the Tsétsêhéstâhese (also spelled Tsitsistas). The tribes merged in the early 19th century.

At the time of their first European contact, the Cheyenne lived in what is now Minnesota. They were close allies of the Arapaho and loosely aligned with the Lakota. By the early 18th century, they were forced west across the Missouri River and into North and South Dakota, where they adopted the horse culture. Having settled the Black Hills of South Dakota and the Powder River Country of present-day Montana and Wyoming, they introduced the horse culture to Lakota people about 1730. With the Arapaho, the Cheyenne pushed the Kiowa to the Southern Plains. In turn, they were pushed west by the more numerous Lakota.

The main group of Cheyenne, the Tsêhéstáno, was once composed of ten bands that spread across the Great Plains from southern Colorado to the Black Hills in South Dakota. They fought their historic enemies, the Crow and later (1856–79) the United States Army. In the mid-19th century, the bands began to split, with some bands choosing to remain near the Black Hills, while others chose to remain near the Platte Rivers of central Colorado.

The Northern Cheyenne, known in Cheyenne either as Notameohmésêhese, meaning "Northern Eaters" or simply as Ohmésêhese meaning "Eaters", live in southeastern Montana on the Northern Cheyenne Indian Reservation. Tribal enrollment figures, as of late 2014, indicate that there are approximately 10,840 members, of which about 4,939 reside on the reservation. Approximately 91% of the population are Native Americans (full or part race), with 72.8% identifying themselves as Cheyenne. Slightly more than one quarter of the population five years or older spoke a language other than English. The Southern Cheyenne, known in Cheyenne as Heévâhetaneo'o meaning "Roped People", together with the Southern Arapaho, form the Cheyenne and Arapaho Tribes, in western Oklahoma. Their combined population is 12,130, . In 2003, approximately 8,000 of these identified themselves as Cheyenne, although with continuing intermarriage it has become increasingly difficult to separate the tribes.

The Cheyenne 

The Cheyenne are composed of two tribes, the Só'taeo'o or Só'taétaneo'o (more commonly as Suhtai or Sutaio; singular: Só'taétane) and the Tsétsêhéstâhese (more commonly as the Tsitsistas; singular: Tsétsêhéstaestse), which translates to "those who are like this". Both tribes had always traveled together and fully merged sometime after 1883, though maintained separate camps. The Suhtai had slightly different speech and customs from their traveling companions.

The name "Cheyenne" derive from the Lakota Sioux exonym Šahíyena meaning "little Šahíya". The identity of the Šahíya is not known, but many Great Plains tribes assume that it means Cree or another people who spoke an Algonquian language related to Cree and Cheyenne. The Cheyenne word for Ojibwe is Sáhea'eo'o, a word that sounds similar to the Lakota word Šahíya. Cheyenne also means “little beautiful blue bird”.

Another of the common etymologies for Cheyenne is "a bit like the [people of an] alien speech" (literally, "red-talker"). According to George Bird Grinnell, the Lakota had referred to themselves and fellow Siouan-language bands as "white talkers", and those of other language families, such as the Algonquian Cheyenne, as "red talkers" (Šahíyena).

The etymology of the name Tsitsistas (technically Tsétsėhéstȧhese), which the Cheyenne call themselves, is uncertain. According to the Cheyenne dictionary offered online by Chief Dull Knife College, there is no definitive consensus, though various studies of the origins and translation of the word have been suggested. Grinnell's record is typical and states, "They call themselves Tsistsistas [sic, Tsitsistas is the correct pronunciation], which the books commonly give as meaning "people". It most likely means related to one another, similarly bred, like us, our people, or us. The term for the Cheyenne homeland is Tsiihistano.

Language

The Cheyenne of Montana and Oklahoma speak the Cheyenne language, known as Tsêhésenêstsestôtse (common spelling: Tsisinstsistots). Approximately 800 people speak Cheyenne in Oklahoma. There are only a handful of vocabulary differences between the two locations. The Cheyenne alphabet contains 14 letters. The Cheyenne language is one of the larger Algonquian-language group. Formerly, the Só'taeo'o (Só'taétaneo'o) or Suhtai (Sutaio) bands of Southern and Northern Cheyenne spoke Só'taéka'ęškóne or Só'taenęstsestôtse, a language so close to Tsêhésenêstsestôtse (Cheyenne language), that it is sometimes termed a Cheyenne dialect.

History

The earliest written historical record of the Cheyenne was in the mid-17th century, when a group of Cheyenne visited the French Fort Crevecoeur, near present-day Peoria, Illinois. The Cheyenne at this time lived between the Mississippi River and Mille Lacs Lake. Their economy was based on the collection of wild rice and hunting, especially of bison, which lived in the prairies 70–80 miles west of the Cheyenne villages.

According to tribal history, during the 17th century, the Cheyenne were driven by the Assiniboine (Hóheeheo'o) from the Great Lakes region to present-day Minnesota and North Dakota, where they established villages. The most prominent of the ancient Cheyenne villages is Biesterfeldt Village, in eastern North Dakota along the Sheyenne River. They first reached the Missouri River in 1676. A more recent analysis of early records posits that at least some of the Cheyenne remained in the Mille Lac region of Minnesota until about 1765, when the Ojibwe defeated the Lakota with firearms — pushing the Cheyenne, in turn, to the Minnesota River, where they were reported in 1766.

On the Missouri River, the Cheyenne came into contact with the neighboring Mandan, Hidatsa (Tsé-heše'émâheónese, "people who have soil houses"), and Arikara people (Ónoneo'o), adopting many of their cultural characteristics. They were first of the later Plains tribes to move into the Black Hills and Powder River Country. About 1730, they introduced the horse to Lakota bands (Ho'óhomo'eo'o). Conflict with migrating Lakota and Ojibwe people forced the Cheyenne further west, and they, in turn, pushed the Kiowa to the south.

By 1776, the Lakota had overwhelmed the Cheyenne and taken over much of their territory near the Black Hills. In 1804, Lewis and Clark visited a surviving Cheyenne village in what is now North Dakota. Such European explorers learned many different names for the Cheyenne and did not realize how the different sections were forming a unified tribe.

The Cheyenne Nation is descended from two related tribes, the Tsétsêhéstâhese / Tsitsistas (Cheyenne proper) and Só'taeo'o / Só'taétaneo'o (better known as Suhtai or Sutaio). The latter may have joined the Tsétsêhéstâhese in the early 18th century. Their oral history relays that both tribal peoples are characterized, and represented by two cultural heroes or prophets who received divine articles from their god Ma'heo'o, which the Só'taeo'o called He'emo.

The Tsétsêhéstâhese / Tsitsistas prophet Motsé'eóeve (Sweet Medicine Standing, Sweet Root Standing, commonly called Sweet Medicine) received the Maahótse ((Sacred) Arrows Bundle) at Nóávóse (″medicine(sacred)-hill″, name for Bear Butte, northwest of Rapid City, South Dakota, which they carried when they waged tribal-level war and were kept in the maahéome (Arrow Lodge or Arrow Tepee). He organized the structure of Cheyenne society, their military or war societies led by prominent warriors, their system of legal justice, and the Council of Forty-four peace chiefs. The latter was formed from four véhoo'o (chiefs or leaders) of the ten principal manaho (bands) and an additional four ″Old Man″ meetings to deliberate at regular tribal gatherings, centered around the Sun Dance.

Sweet Medicine is the Cheyenne prophet who predicted the coming of the horse, the cow, the white man and other new things to the Cheyenne. He was named for motsé'eonȯtse (sweetgrass), one of the sacred plant medicines used by many Plains peoples in ceremonies.
The Maahótse (Sacred Arrows) are symbols of male power. The Ésevone / Hóhkėha'e (Sacred Buffalo Hat) is the symbol of female power. The Sacred Buffalo Hat and the Sacred Arrows together form the two great covenants of the Cheyenne Nation. Through these two bundles, Ma'heo'o assures continual life and blessings for the people.

The Só'taeo'o prophet Tomȯsévėséhe ("Erect Horns") received the Ésevone (aka Is'siwun – "Sacred (Buffalo) Hat Bundle") at Toh'nihvoos (″Stone Hammer Mountain″) near the Great Lakes in the present state of Minnesota. The Ésevone / Hóhkėha'e (Sacred Buffalo Hat) is kept in the vonȧhéome (old term) or hóhkėha'éome (new term) ("Sacred Hat Lodge, Sacred Hat Tepee"). Erect Horns gave them the accompanying ceremonies and the Sun Dance. His vision convinced the tribe to abandon their earlier sedentary agricultural traditions to adopt nomadic Plains horse culture. They replaced their earth lodges with portable tipis and switched their diet from fish and agricultural produce, to mainly bison and wild fruits and vegetables. Their lands ranged from the upper Missouri River into what is now Wyoming, Montana, Colorado, and South Dakota.

The Ésevone / Hóhkėha'e ("Sacred Buffalo Hat") is kept among the Northern Cheyenne and Northern Só'taeo'o. The Tséá'enōvȧhtse (″Sacred (Buffalo) Hat Keeper″ or ″Keeper of the Sacred (Buffalo) Hat″) must belong to the Só'taeo'o (Northern or Southern alike). In the 1870s tribal leaders became disenchanted with the keeper of the bundle demanded the keeper Broken Dish give up the bundle; he agreed but his wife did not and desecrated the Sacred Hat and its contents; a ceremonial pipe and a buffalo horn were lost. In 1908 a Cheyenne named Three Fingers gave the horn back to the Hat. The pipe came into possession of a Cheyenne named Burnt All Over who gave it to Hattie Goit of Poteau, Oklahoma who in 1911 gave the pipe to the Oklahoma Historical Society. In 1997 the Oklahoma Historal Society negotiated with the Northern Cheyenne to return the pipe to the tribal keeper of the Sacred Medicine Hat Bundle James Black Wolf.

Historical Cheyenne bands

Northern Cheyenne

Known in Cheyenne either as Notameohmésêhese or Notameohmésėhétaneo'o meaning "Northern Eaters" or simply as Ohmésêhese / Ôhmésêheseo'o meaning "Eaters".
 Notameohmésêhese / Notameohmésėhétaneo'o proper ("Northern Eaters", also simply known as Ȯhmésėhese / Ôhmésêheseo'o or Omísis – "Eaters" - They go by these names because they were known as great hunters and therefore had a good supply of meat to feed their people. They were the most populous Cheyenne group, inhabiting land from the northern and western Black Hills (Mo'ȯhtávo'honáéva – ″black-rock-Location″) toward the Powder River Country (Páeo'hé'e – ″gunpowder river″ or ″coal river″). Often they were accompanied by their Totoemanaho and Northern Só'taeo'o kin and had through intermarriages close ties to Lakota. Today they, along with the Northern Só'taeo'o, are the most influential among the Northern Cheyenne.
 Northern Oévemanaho / Oivimána (Northern Oévemana – "Northern Scabby", "Northern Scalpers" - They now live in and around Birney, Montana (Oévemanâhéno – ″scabby-band-place″) near the confluence of the Tongue River and Hanging Woman Creek in the southeastern corner of the Northern Cheyenne Indian Reservation)
 Northern Só'taeo'o / Só'taétaneo'o (Suhtai or Sutaio - They married only other Só'taeo'o (Northern or Southern alike) and camped separate from the other Cheyenne camps. They maintained closest ties to the Notameohmésêhese band and lived in the northern and western Black Hills (Mo'ȯhtávo'honáéva – ″black-rock-Location″). They also roamed together with their Notameohmésêhese and Totoemanaho kin in the Powder River Country (Páeo'hé'e), remaining north of the Platte River. They gained higher band numbers than their southern kin because of better Northern hunting and grass. They now live in and around Birney, Montana (Oévemanâhéno – ″scabby-band-place″). Today they, along with the Notameohmésêhese, are the most influential among the Northern Cheyenne.

Lesser northern bands (not represented in the Council of Forty-Four):
 Anskówînîs / Anskowinis ("Narrow Nose", "narrow-nose-bridge" - They are named after their first chief, properly named Broken Dish, but nicknamed Anskówǐnǐs. They separated from the Ôhmésêheseo'o because of a quarrel.
 Moktavhetaneo / Mo'ȯhtávėhetaneo'o (Mo'ôhtávêhetane – "Black skinned Men", "Ute-like Men" They are named this because they had darker skin than other Cheyenne and looked more like the Utes. Their name also means ″Mountain Men″, maybe descended from Ute (Mo'ȯhtávėhetaneo'o) captives. They live today in the Lame Deer, Montana (Mo'ȯhtávȯheomenéno – ″black-lodge-place″) district on the Northern Cheyenne Indian Reservation. Lame Deer, the tribal and government agency headquarters, was also the place where rations were given out and is known as Meaveʼhoʼeno – ″the giving place″ or ″giving-whiteman-place″.
 Ononeo'o / Ononeo ("Arikara People" or ″Ree Band″) - This band is of mixed Cheyenne-Arikara and Mandan heritage. They were formerly associated with the mixed Cheyenne-Lakota Masikota band and sometimes considered a Masikota subband. today they live in the nonofficial Rosebud/Ree district (Ónoneo'o), politically part of the Muddy Creek district, between Busby and Muddy Creek, some are also present in the Lame Deer district)
 Totoemanaho / Totoimana (Totoemana, Tútoimanáh – "Backward Clan", "Shy Clan" or "Bashful Clan", also translated as ″Reticent Band″, and ″Unwilling Band″, so named because they prefer to camp by themselves, lived in the northern and western Black Hills (Mo'ȯhtávo'honáéva – ″black-rock-Location″) and along the Tongue River (Vétanovéo'hé'e – ″Tongue River″), roamed together with their Notameohmésêhese and Northern Só'taeo'o kin also in the Powder River Country (Páeo'hé'e), had through intermarriages close ties to Lakota, now centered in and around Ashland, Montana (Vóhkoohémâhoéve'ho'éno, formerly called Totoemanáheno) immediately east of the boundary of the Northern Cheyenne Indian Reservation)
 Vóhpoométaneo'o / Woxpometaneo (Voxpometaneo – "White River People", ″White River Cheyenne″) Named for the White River (Vóhpoome) near Pine Ridge in South Dakota and also named after a large extended family as Wóopotsît or Wóhkpotsit – "White Wolf", ″White Crafty People″. The majority joined their Cheyenne kin and settled in 1891 south of Kirby, Montana near the headwaters of the Rosebud Creek. They are now centered in and around Busby, Montana (Vóhpoométanéno) on the Northern Cheyenne Indian Reservation. Some stayed on the Pine Ridge Indian Reservation with their Oglala Lakota kin and are known as Tsėhésė-ho'óhomo'eo'o – ″Cheyenne-Sioux″.

Southern Cheyenne

Known in Cheyenne as Heévâhetaneo'o meaning "Roped People." Named after the most populous band, also commonly known as Sówoniá – "the Southern People."

 Heévâhetaneo'o / Hevhaitaneo proper (Hévhaitanio – "Haire Rope Men", "Hairy People", also ″Fur Men″) In the past they were close affiliated to Arapaho. Known as great warriors and noted among the Cheyenne as the best horse tamers and horse raiders from surrounding tribes, especially from the horse-rich Kiowa (Vétapâhaetó'eo'o) and Comanche (Šé'šenovotsétaneo'o) to the south. They formed in 1826 under their Chief Yellow Wolf (Ho'néoxheóvaestse) together with some Arapaho. They migrated along with some other Cheyenne bands south of the Platte River (Meneo'hé'e – ″Moon Shell River″) toward the Arkansas River (Mótsėsóoneo'hé'e – ″Flint River″) and the establishment of Bents Fort. Their tribal lands were between the Southern Oévemanaho in the west, the Wotápio in the east and the Dog Soldiers and Hesé'omeétaneo'o in the north. The Cholera Outbreak of 1849 killed many of the band. About half of the band perished in the Sand Creek Massacre, including the chiefs Yellow Wolf and Big Man. They are today predominant among the Southern Cheyenne.
 Hesé'omeétaneo'o / Hisiometaneo (Hisíometanio or Issiometaniu – "Ridge People/Men" or ″Hill Band″, also given as ″Pipestem (River) People″)  Originally part of the Heévâhetaneo'o, they had close ties with the Oglala and Sičháŋǧu (Brulé) Lakota. They first lived just south of the Masikota along the Niobrara River north of the North Platte River in Nebraska, then later moved south into the hill country along the Upper Smoky Hill River and north of the Upper Arkansas River in Colorado – in lands mostly west of the closely associated Southern Só'taeo'o and Dog Soldiers band and north of the Southern Oévemanaho and Heévâhetaneo'o, ranged sometimes with Comanche south onto the Staked Plains. Under chief White Antelope, many died in the Sand Creek Massacre.
 Heviksnipahis / Iviststsinihpah ("Aorta People" or "Burnt Aorta People"; as caretakers for the Sacred Arrows, they were also considered as the Tsétsêhéstâhese / Tsitsistas proper or known to the other bands as ″Arrow People″) Originally living along the forks of the Cheyenne River and in the eastern Black Hills in western Wyoming, they moved between 1815 and 1825 south to the forks of the North and South Platte River (Vétaneo'hé'e – ″Fat River″ or ″Tallow River″). Their lands were a central location for all bands and convenient for the performance of the annual ceremonies. Later, they moved further south and ranged between the Dog Soldiers band in the north, the Oo'kóhta'oná in the southeast, the Hónowa and Wotápio in the south.
 Hónowa / Háovȯhnóvȧhese / Nėstamenóoheo'o (Háovôhnóva, Hownowa, Hotnowa – "Poor People", also known as ″Red Lodges People″) They lived south of the Oo'kóhta'oná and east of the Wotápio.
 Southern Oévemanaho / Oivimána (Southern Oévemana – "Southern Scabby", "Southern Scalpers") Originally part of the Heévâhetaneo'o, they were close affiliated to Arapaho and moved together under Chief Yellow Wolf in 1826 south of the Platte River to the Arkansas River. They lived south and west of the Heévâhetaneo'o. Led by War Bonnet they lost about half their number in the Sand Creek Massacre. They now live near Watonga (Tséh-ma'ėho'a'ē'ta – ″where there are red (hills) facing together″, also called Oévemanâhéno – ″scabby-band-place″) and Canton, Blaine County, on lands of the former Cheyenne and Arapaho Indian Reservation in Oklahoma.
 Masikota ("Crickets", "Grasshoppers", ″Grey Hair(ed) band″, ″Flexed Leg band″ or ″Wrinkled Up band″) Named perhaps from the Lakotiyapi word mazikute – "iron (rifle) shooters", from mazi – "iron" and kute – "to shoot", mixed Cheyenne-Lakota band. They were known by the latter as 'Sheo', lived southeast of the Black Hills along the White River (Vóhpoome), intermarried with Oglala Lakota and Sičháŋǧu Oyáte (Brule Lakota) and was the first group of the tribal unit on the Plains. Hence their name First Named. The cholera epidemic of 1849 almost wiped them out. Afterwards they joined the military society Dog Soldiers (Hotamétaneo'o), which took their place as a band in the Cheyenne tribal circle. They were not present at the Sand Creek Massacre. They played an important role at Battle of Summit Springs of 1869.
 Oo'kóhta'oná / Ohktounna (Oktogona, Oktogana, Oqtóguna or Oktoguna – "Bare Legged", "Protruding Jaw") Their name refers to the art of dancing the Deer Dance before going to war. They formerly associated with the mixed Cheyenne-Lakota Masikota band, sometimes considered a Masikota subband. They lived north of the Hónowa and south of the Heviksnipahis,. The cholera epidemic of 1849 almost wiped them out. They might have joined the Dog Soldiers afterwards.
 Wotápio / Wutapai (from the Lakotiyapi word Wutapiu: – "Eat with Lakota-Sioux", "Half-Cheyenne", "Cheyenne-Sioux") They were originally a band of Lakota Sioux who later joined the Southern Cheyenne. By 1820 they had moved south to the Arkansas River in Colorado, where they lived and camped together with their Kiowa allies. Through intermarriage they became a mixed Cheyenne-speaking and identifying hybrid Cheyenne-Kiowa band with Lakota origin. Their hunting lands were between the Hónowa in the east, the Heévâhetaneo'o to the west, and the Heviksnipahis to the north. They were the band hardest hit by the Sand Creek Massacre.
 Southern Só'taeo'o / Só'taétaneo'o (Suhtai or Sutaio) They married only other Só'taeo'o (Northern or Southern alike) and always camped separately from the other Cheyenne camp. They maintained closest ties to the Hesé'omeétaneo'o band, joined with the emerging Dog Soldiers band lands along the Smoky Hill River (Mano'éo'hé'e – ″gather(timber) river″), Saline (Šéstotó'eo'hé'e – "Cedar River") and Solomon Rivers (Ma'xêhe'néo'hé'e – "turkey-creek"), in north-central Kansas. Their favorite hunting grounds were north of the Dog Soldiers along the upper sub-basins of the Republican River (Ma'êhóóhévâhtseo'hé'e – ″Red Shield River″, so named because there gathered the warriors of the Ma'ėhoohēvȧhtse (Red Shield Warriors Society)) especially along the Beaver Creek, which was also a spiritual place. The Hesé'omeétaneo'o mostly ranged west and northwest of them.

Lesser southern bands (not represented in the Council of Forty-Four):
 Moiseo / Moiseyu (Monsoni – "Flint-Men", called after the Flintmen Society (Motsêsóonetaneo'o)) They were also called Otata-voha – "Blue Horses", after Blue Horse, the first leader of the Coyote Warriors Society (O'ôhoménotâxeo'o). Both were branches of the Fox Warriors Society (Vóhkêséhetaneo'o or Monêsóonetaneo'o), one of the four original Cheyenne military societies, also known as ″Flies.″ Originally a Sioux band from Minnesota, the greater part left the Cheyenne about 1815 joining Sioux bands in Minnesota. The remaining associated strongly with / or joined the Wotápio.
 Ná'kuimana / Nakoimana (Nakoimanah – "Bear People")

The ten principal bands that had the right to send four chief delegates representing them in the Council of Forty-Four were the
 Heviksnipahis (Iviststsinihpah, also known as the Tsétsêhéstâhese / Tsitsistas proper)
 Heévâhetaneo'o (Hevhaitaneo)
 Masikota (in Lakotiyapi: Sheo)
 Omísis (Ôhmésêheseo'o, the Notameohmésêhese proper)
 Só'taeo'o / Só'taétaneo'o (Suhtai or Sutaio, Northern and Southern)
 Wotápio (Wutapai)
 Oévemanaho (Oivimána or Oévemana, Northern and Southern)
 Hesé'omeétaneo'o (Hisiometaneo or Issiometaniu)
 Oo'kóhta'oná (Ohktounna or Oqtóguna)
 Hónowa (Háovȯhnóvȧhese or Nėstamenóoheo'o)

After the Masikota and Oo'kóhta'oná bands had been almost wiped out through a cholera epidemic in 1849, the remaining Masikota joined the Dog Soldiers warrior society (Hotamétaneo'o). They effectively became a separate band and in 1850 took over the position in the camp circle formerly occupied by the Masikota. The members often opposed policies of peace chiefs such as Black Kettle. Over time, the Dog Soldiers took a prominent leadership role in the wars against the whites. In 1867, most of the band were killed by United States Army forces in the Battle of Summit Springs.

Due to an increasing division between the Dog Soldiers and the council chiefs with respect to policy towards the whites, the Dog Soldiers separated from the other Cheyenne bands. They effectively became a third division of the Cheyenne people, between the Northern Cheyenne, who ranged north of the Platte River, and the Southern Cheyenne, who occupied the area north of the Arkansas River.

Expansion on the Plains

After being pushed south and westward by the Lakota, the unified Cheyenne people began to create and expand a new territory of their own. Sometime around 1811, the Cheyenne made a formal alliance with the Arapaho people (Hetanevo'eo'o – "People of the Sky", "Cloud People", because of their close interaction also known as Héstanėheo'o – "people, mankind, tribe of people"), which would remain strong throughout their history and into modern times. The alliance helped the Cheyenne expand their territory which stretched from southern Montana, through most of Wyoming, the eastern half of Colorado, far western Nebraska, and far western Kansas. As early as 1820, traders and explorers reported contact with Cheyenne at present-day Denver, Colorado and on the Arkansas River. They were probably hunting and trading in that area earlier. They may have migrated to the south for winter. The Hairy Rope band is reputed to have been the first band to move south, capturing wild horses as far south as the Cimarron River Valley. In response to the construction of Bent's Fort by Charles Bent, a friend of the Cheyenne who established a popular trading area for the Cheyenne, a large portion of the tribe moved further south and stayed around the area. The other part of the tribe continued to live along the headwaters of the North Platte and Yellowstone rivers. The groups became the Southern Cheyenne, known as Sówoníă (Southerners) and the Northern Cheyenne, known as O'mǐ'sǐs (Eaters). The separation of the tribe was only a geographic one and the two divisions had regular and close contact.

In the southern portion of their territory, the Cheyenne and Arapaho warred with the allied Comanche, Kiowa, and Plains Apache. Numerous battles were fought including a notable fight along the Washita River in 1836 with the Kiowa which resulted in the death of 48 Cheyenne warriors of the Bowstring society. In summer 1838, many Cheyenne and Arapaho attacked a camp of Kiowa and Comanche along Wolf Creek in Oklahoma resulting in heavy losses from both sides. Conflict with the Comanche, Kiowa, and Plains Apache ended in 1840 when the tribes made an alliance with each other. The new alliance allowed the Cheyenne to enter the Llano Estacado in the Texas and Oklahoma panhandles and northeastern New Mexico to hunt bison and trade. Their expansion in the south and alliance with the Kiowa led to their first raid into Mexico in 1853. The raid ended in disaster with heavy resistance from Mexican lancers, resulting in all but three of the war party being killed. To the north, the Cheyenne made a strong alliance with the Lakota Sioux, which allowed them to expand their territory into part of their former lands around the Black Hills. They managed to escape the smallpox epidemics, which swept across the plains from white settlements in 1837–39, by heading into the Rocky Mountains but were greatly affected by the Cholera epidemic in 1849. Contact with Euro-Americans was mostly light, with most contact involving mountain men, traders, explorers, treaty makers, and painters..

Enemies and warrior culture

Like many other plains Indian nations, the Cheyenne were a horse and warrior people who developed as skilled and powerful mounted warriors. A warrior was viewed by the people not as a maker of war but as a protector, provider, and leader. Warriors gained rank in Cheyenne society by performing and accumulating various acts of bravery in battle known as coups. The title of war chief could be earned by any warrior who performs enough of the specific coups required to become a war chief. Specific warrior societies developed among the Cheyenne as with other plains nations. Each society had selected leaders who would invite those that they saw worthy enough to their society lodge for initiation into the society. Often, societies would have minor rivalries; however, they might work together as a unit when warring with an enemy. Military societies played an important role in Cheyenne government. Society leaders were often in charge of organizing hunts and raids as well as ensuring proper discipline and the enforcement of laws within the nation. Each of the six distinct warrior societies of the Cheyenne would take turns assuming the leadership role within the nation. The four original military societies of the Cheyenne were the Swift Fox Society, Elk Horn Scrapper or Crooked Lance Society, Shield Society, and the Bowstring Men Society. The fifth society is split between the Crazy Dog Society and the famous Dog Soldiers. The sixth society is the Contrary Warrior Society, most notable for riding backwards into battle as a sign of bravery. All six societies and their various branches exist among the Southern and Northern Cheyenne Nations in present times. Warriors used a combination of traditional weapons such as various types of war clubs, tomahawks, bows and arrows, and lances as well as non-traditional weapons such as revolvers, rifles, and shotguns acquired through raid and trade.

The enemies of the Cheyenne included the Crow (Óoetaneo'o – "crow (bird) people"), Shoshone (Sósone'eo'o), Blackfeet (Mo'ôhtávêhahtátaneo'o, same literal meaning), Flathead (Kȧhkoestséataneo'o – "flat-headed-people"), Nez Perce (Otaesétaneo'o – "pierced nose people"), Arikara, Gros Ventre (Hestóetaneo'o – "beggars for meat", "spongers" or Môhónooneo'o – lit. "scouting all over ones"), Assiniboine, and Plains Cree (Vóhkoohétaneo'o – "rabbit people") to the north and west of Cheyenne territory. By the help of the Medicine Arrows (the Mahuts), the Cheyenne tribe massacred a Crow camp in 1820. To the east of Cheyenne Territory they fought with the Sioux, Pawnee (Ho'néhetaneo'o – "wolf people", possibly an adaptive from the Skiri/Skidi Pawnee or Wolf Pawnee), Ponca (Onéhao'o), Kaw (Oo'kóhtâxétaneo'o – "cut hair people"), Iowa, Ho-Chunk and Omaha (Onéhao'o). The Cheyenne lost the Medicine Arrows during an attack on a hunting camp of Pawnees around 1830. South of Cheyenne territory they fought with the Kiowa (Vétapâhaetó'eo'o – "greasy wood ones"), Comanche (Šé'šenovotsétaneo'o – "snake people"), Ute (Mo'ȯhtávėhetaneo'o – "black (skinned) people"), Plains Apache (Mȯhtséheonetaneo'o – "occupied.comp-people"), Osage (Oo'kóhtâxétaneo'o – "cut hair people"), Wichita people, various Apache tribes and Navajo (Hotamó'keeho – "Indians from out west"; collective name for tribes of the Southswest and Great Basin). Many of the enemies the Cheyenne fought were only encountered occasionally, such as on a long-distance raid or hunt. Some of their enemies, particularly the Indian peoples of the eastern great plains such as the Pawnee and Osage would act as Indian Scouts for the US Army, providing valuable tracking skills and information regarding Cheyenne habits and fighting strategies to US soldiers. Some of their enemies such as the Lakota would later in their history become their strong allies, helping the Cheyenne fight against the United States Army during Red Cloud's War and the Great Sioux War of 1876. The Comanche, Kiowa and Plains Apache became allies of the Cheyenne towards the end of the Indian wars on the southern plains, fighting together during conflicts such as the Red River War.

Relationship with the Arapaho

The Cheyenne and Arapaho people formed an alliance around 1811 that helped them expand their territories and strengthen their presence on the plains. Like the Cheyenne, the Arapaho language is part of the Algonquian group, although the two languages are not mutually intelligible. The Arapaho remained strong allies with the Cheyenne and helped them fight alongside the Sioux during Red Cloud's War and the Great Sioux War of 1876, also known commonly as the Black Hills War. On the southern plains, the Arapaho and Cheyenne allied with the Comanche, Kiowa, and Plains Apache to fight invading settlers and US soldiers. The Arapaho were present with the Cheyenne at the Sand Creek Massacre when a peaceful encampment of mostly women, children, and the elderly were attacked and massacred by US soldiers. Both major divisions of the Cheyenne, the Northern Cheyenne and Southern Cheyenne were allies to the Arapaho who like the Cheyenne are split into northern and southern divisions. The Southern Cheyenne and Southern Arapaho were assigned to the same reservation in Oklahoma Indian Territory and remained together as the federally recognized Cheyenne and Arapaho Tribes after the reservation was opened to American settlement and into modern times. The Northern Arapaho were to be assigned a reservation of their own or share one with the Cheyenne however the government failed to provide them with either and placed them on the already established Wind River Indian Reservation in Wyoming with their former enemies the Shoshone.

Treaty of 1825
In the summer of 1825, the tribe was visited on the upper Missouri by a US treaty commission consisting of General Henry Atkinson and Indian agent Benjamin O'Fallon, accompanied by a military escort of 476 men. General Atkinson and his fellow commissioner left Fort Atkinson on May 16, 1825. Ascending the Missouri, they negotiated treaties of friendship and trade with tribes of the upper Missouri, including the Arikara, the Cheyenne, the Crow, the Mandan, the Ponca, and several bands of the Sioux. At that time, the US had competition on the upper Missouri from British traders, who came south from Canada.

The treaties acknowledged that the tribes lived within the United States, vowed perpetual friendship between the US and the tribes, and, recognizing the right of the United States to regulate trade, the tribes promised to deal only with licensed traders. The tribes agreed to forswear private retaliation for injuries, and to return stolen horses or other goods or compensate the owner. The commission's efforts to contact the Blackfoot and the Assiniboine were unsuccessful. During their return to Fort Atkinson at the Council Bluff in Nebraska, the commission had successful negotiations with the Ota, the Pawnee and the Omaha.

Effects of the Emigrant Trail
Increased traffic of emigrants along the related Oregon, Mormon and California trails, beginning in the early 1840s, heightened competition with Native Americans for scarce resources of water and game in arid areas. With resource depletion along the trails, the Cheyenne became increasingly divided into the Northern Cheyenne and Southern Cheyenne, where they could have adequate territory for sustenance.

During the California Gold Rush, emigrants brought in cholera. It spread in mining camps and waterways due to poor sanitation. The disease was generally a major cause of death for emigrants, about one-tenth of whom died during their journeys.

Perhaps from traders, the cholera epidemic reached the Plains Indians in 1849, resulting in severe loss of life during the summer of that year. Historians estimate about 2,000 Cheyenne died, one-half to two-thirds of their population. There were significant losses among other tribes as well, which weakened their social structures. Perhaps because of severe loss of trade during the 1849 season, Bent's Fort was abandoned and burned.

Fort Laramie Treaty of 1851

In 1846, Thomas Fitzpatrick was appointed US Indian agent for the upper Arkansas and Platte River. His efforts to negotiate with the Northern Cheyenne, the Arapaho and other tribes led to a great council at Fort Laramie in 1851. Treaties were negotiated by a commission consisting of Fitzpatrick and David Dawson Mitchell, US Superintendent of Indian Affairs, with the Indians of the northern plains.

To reduce intertribal warfare on the Plains, the government officials "assigned" territories to each tribe and had them pledge mutual peace. In addition, the government secured permission to build and maintain roads for European-American travelers and traders through Indian country on the Plains, such as the Emigrant Trail and the Santa Fe Trail, and to maintain forts to guard them. The tribes were compensated with annuities of cash and supplies for such encroachment on their territories. The Fort Laramie Treaty of 1851 affirmed the Cheyenne and Arapaho territory on the Great Plains between the North Platte River and the Arkansas. This territory included what is now Colorado, east of the Front Range of the Rockies and north of the Arkansas River; Wyoming and Nebraska, south of the North Platte River; and extreme western Kansas.

Punitive US expedition of 1857
In April 1856, an incident at the Platte River Bridge (near present-day Casper, Wyoming), resulted in the wounding of a Cheyenne warrior. He returned to the Cheyenne on the plains. During the summer of 1856, Indians attacked travelers along the Emigrant Trail near Fort Kearny. In retaliation, the US Cavalry attacked a Cheyenne camp on Grand Island in Nebraska. They killed ten Cheyenne warriors and wounded eight or more.

Cheyenne parties attacked at least three emigrant settler parties before returning to the Republican River. The Indian agent at Fort Laramie negotiated with the Cheyenne to reduce hostilities, but the Secretary of War ordered the 1st Cavalry Regiment (1855) to carry out a punitive expedition under the command of Colonel Edwin V. Sumner. He went against the Cheyenne in the spring of 1857. Major John Sedgwick led part of the expedition up the Arkansas River, and via Fountain Creek to the South Platte River. Sumner's command went west along the North Platte to Fort Laramie, then down along the Front Range to the South Platte. The combined force of 400 troops went east through the plains searching for Cheyenne.

Under the influence of the medicine man White Bull (also called Ice) and Grey Beard (also called Dark), the Cheyenne went into battle believing that strong spiritual medicine would prevent the soldiers' guns from firing. They were told that if they dipped their hands in a nearby spring, they had only to raise their hands to repel army bullets. Hands raised, the Cheyenne surrounded the advancing troops as they advanced near the Solomon River. Sumner ordered a cavalry charge and the troops charged with drawn sabers; the Cheyenne fled. With tired horses after long marches, the cavalry could not engage more than a few Cheyenne, as their horses were fresh.

This was the first battle which the Cheyenne fought against the US Army. Casualties were few on each side; J.E.B. Stuart, then a young lieutenant, was shot in the breast while attacking a Cheyenne warrior with a sabre. The troops continued on and two days later burned a hastily abandoned Cheyenne camp; they destroyed lodges and the winter supply of buffalo meat.

Sumner continued to Bent's Fort. To punish the Cheyenne, he distributed their annuities to the Arapaho. He intended further punitive actions, but the Army ordered him to Utah because of an outbreak of trouble with the Mormons (this would be known as the Utah War). The Cheyenne moved below the Arkansas into Kiowa and Comanche country. In the fall, the Northern Cheyenne returned to their country north of the Platte.

Pike's Peak Gold Rush
 

Starting in 1859 with the Colorado Gold Rush, European-American settlers moved into lands reserved for the Cheyenne and other Plains Indians. Travel greatly increased along the Emigrant Trail along the South Platte River and some emigrants stopped before going on to California. For several years there was peace between settlers and Indians. The only conflicts were related to the endemic warfare between the Cheyenne and Arapaho of the plains and the Utes of the mountains.

US negotiations with Black Kettle and other Cheyenne favoring peace resulted in the Treaty of Fort Wise: it established a small reservation for the Cheyenne in southeastern Colorado in exchange for the territory agreed to in the Fort Laramie Treaty of 1851. Many Cheyenne did not sign the treaty, and they continued to live and hunt on their traditional grounds in the Smoky Hill and Republican basins, between the Arkansas and the South Platte, where there were plentiful buffalo.

Efforts to make a wider peace continued, but in the spring of 1864, John Evans, governor of Colorado Territory, and John Chivington, commander of the Colorado Volunteers, a citizens militia, began a series of attacks on Indians camping or hunting on the plains. They killed any Indian on sight and initiated the Colorado War. General warfare broke out and Indians made many raids on the trail along the South Platte, which Denver depended on for supplies. The Army closed the road from August 15 until September 24, 1864.

On November 29, 1864, the Colorado Militia attacked a Cheyenne and Arapaho encampment under Chief Black Kettle, although it flew a flag of truce and indicated its allegiance to the US government. The Sand Creek massacre, as it came to be known, resulted in the death of between 150 and 200 Cheyenne, mostly unarmed women and children. The survivors fled northeast and joined the camps of the Cheyenne on the Smoky Hill and Republican rivers. There warriors smoked the war pipe, passing it from camp to camp among the Sioux, Cheyenne and Arapaho.

In January 1865, they planned and carried out an attack with about 1000 warriors on Camp Rankin, a stage station and fort at Julesburg. The Indians made numerous raids along the South Platte, both east and west of Julesburg, and raided the fort again in early February. They captured much loot and killed many European Americans. Most of the Indians moved north into Nebraska on their way to the Black Hills and the Powder River. (See Battle of Julesburg, Battle of Mud Springs, Battle of Rush Creek, Powder River Expedition, Battle of Platte Bridge)

Black Kettle continued to desire peace and did not join in the second raid or in the plan to go north to the Powder River country. He left the large camp and returned with 80 lodges of his tribesmen to the Arkansas River, where he intended to seek peace with the US.

Battle of Washita River
Four years later, on November 27, 1868, George Armstrong Custer and his troops attacked Black Kettle's band at the Battle of Washita River. Although his band was camped on a defined reservation, complying with the government's orders, some of its members had been linked to raiding into Kansas by bands operating out of the Indian Territory. Custer claimed 103 Cheyenne "warriors" and an unspecified number of women and children killed whereas different Cheyenne informants named between 11 and 18 men (mostly 10 Cheyenne, 2 Arapaho, 1 Mexican trader) and between 17 and 25 women and children killed in the village.

There are conflicting claims as to whether the band was hostile or friendly. Historians believe that Chief Black Kettle, head of the band, was not part of the war party but the peace party within the Cheyenne nation. But, he did not command absolute authority over members of his band and the European Americans did not understand this. When younger members of the band took part in raiding parties, European Americans blamed the entire band for the incidents and casualties.

Battle of the Little Bighorn

The Northern Cheyenne fought in the Battle of the Little Bighorn, which took place on June 25, 1876. The Cheyenne, together with the Lakota, other Sioux warriors and a small band of Arapaho, killed General George Armstrong Custer and much of his 7th Cavalry contingent of soldiers. Historians have estimated that the population of the Cheyenne, Lakota and Arapaho encampment along the Little Bighorn River was approximately 10,000, making it one of the largest gatherings of Native Americans in North America in pre-reservation times. News of the event traveled across the United States and reached Washington, D.C., just as the nation was celebrating its Centennial. Public reaction arose in outrage against the Cheyenne.

Northern Cheyenne Exodus

Following the Battle of the Little Bighorn, the US Army increased attempts to capture the Cheyenne. In 1879, after the Dull Knife Fight, when Crazy Horse surrendered at Fort Robinson, a few Cheyenne chiefs and their people surrendered as well. They were Dull Knife, Standing Elk and Wild Hog with around 130 Cheyenne. Later that year Two Moons surrendered at Fort Keogh, with 300 Cheyenne. The Cheyenne wanted and expected to live on the reservation with the Sioux in accordance to an April 29, 1868 treaty of Fort Laramie, which both Dull Knife and Little Wolf had signed.

As part of a US increase in troops following the Battle of the Little Bighorn, the Army reassigned Colonel Ranald S. Mackenzie and his Fourth Cavalry to the Department of the Platte. Stationed initially at Camp Robinson, they formed the core of the Powder River Expedition. It departed in October 1876 to locate the northern Cheyenne villages. On November 25, 1876, his column discovered and defeated a village of Northern Cheyenne in the Dull Knife Fight in Wyoming Territory. After the soldiers destroyed the lodges and supplies and confiscated the horses, the Northern Cheyenne soon surrendered. They hoped to remain with the Sioux in the north but the US pressured them to locate with the Southern Cheyenne on their reservation in Indian Territory. After a difficult council, the Northern Cheyenne eventually agreed to go South.

When the Northern Cheyenne arrived at Indian Territory, conditions were very difficult: rations were inadequate, there were no buffalo near the reservation and, according to several sources, there was malaria among the people. On 9 September 1878, a portion of the Northern Cheyenne, led by Little Wolf and Dull Knife started their trek back to the north. After fighting battles with the U.S. army at Turkey Springs and Punished Woman's Fork and reaching the northern area, they split into two bands. That led by Dull Knife (mostly women, children and elders) surrendered and were taken to Fort Robinson, where subsequent events became known as the Fort Robinson tragedy. Dull Knife's group was first offered food and firewood and then, after a week and a half, they were told to go back to Indian territory. When they said no, they were then locked in the wooden barracks with no food, water or firewood for heat for four days. Most escaped in an estimated forty degrees below zero on January 9, 1879, but all were recaptured or killed.

Eventually the US forced the Northern Cheyenne onto a reservation, in southern Montana.

Northern Cheyenne Indian Reservation

The Cheyenne who traveled to Fort Keogh (present-day Miles City, Montana), including Little Wolf, settled near the fort. Many of the Cheyenne worked with the army as scouts. The Cheyenne scouts were pivotal in helping the Army find Chief Joseph and his band of Nez Percé in northern Montana. Fort Keogh became a staging and gathering point for the Northern Cheyenne. Many families began to migrate south to the Tongue River watershed area, where they established homesteads.

It excluded Cheyenne who had homesteaded further east near the Tongue River. The western boundary is the Crow Indian Reservation. Those who had homesteaded east of the Tongue River were relocated to the west of the river.

The Northern Cheyenne, who were sharing the Lakota land at Pine Ridge Indian Reservation were finally allowed to return to the Tongue River on their own reservation. Along with the Lakota and Apache, the Cheyenne were the last nations to be overpowered and forced on reservations. (The Seminole tribe of Florida never made a treaty with the US government.)

The Northern Cheyenne were given the right to remain in the north, near the Black Hills, land which they consider sacred. The Cheyenne also managed to retain their culture, religion and language. Today, the Northern Cheyenne Nation is one of the few American Indian nations to have control over the majority of its land base, currently 98%.

Culture

Over the past 400 years, the Cheyenne have changed their lifestyles. In the 16th century, they lived in the regions near the Great Lakes. They farmed corn, squash, and beans, and harvested wild rice like other indigenous peoples of the Northeastern Woodlands. They migrated west in the 18th century and hunted bison on the Great Plains. By the mid-19th century, the US forced them onto reservations.

The traditional Cheyenne government system is a politically unified system. The central traditional government system of the Cheyenne is the Arrow Keeper, followed by the Council of Forty-Four. Early in Cheyenne history, three related tribes, known as the Heviqsnipahis, the Só'taeo'o and the Masikota, unified themselves to form the Tsé-tsêhéstâhese or the "Like Hearted People" who are known today as the "Cheyenne". The unified tribe then divided themselves into ten principal bands:
 Heviksnipahis (Iviststsinihpah)
 Hévhaitanio (Heévâhetaneo'o)
 Masikota
 Omísis (Ôhmésêheseo'o, the Notameohmésêhese proper)
 Só'taeo'o (Suhtai or Sutaio, Northern and Southern)
 Wotápio
 Oivimána (Oévemana, Northern and Southern)
 Hisíometanio (Hesé'omeétaneo'o or Issiometaniu)
 Ohktounna (Oqtóguna)
 Hónowa (Háovôhnóva)

Each of the ten bands had four seated chief delegates; the remaining four chiefs were the principal advisers of the other delegates. Smaller bands or sub-bands had no right to send delegates to the council. This system also regulated the Cheyenne military societies that developed for planning warfare, enforcing rules, and conducting ceremonies.

Anthropologists debate about Cheyenne societal organization. On the plains, it appears that they had a bilateral band kinship system. However, some anthropologists reported that the Cheyenne had a matrilineal band system. Studies into whether, and if so, how much the Cheyenne developed a matrilineal clan system are continuing.

Horse culture on the Great Plains 
While they participated in nomadic Plains horse culture, men hunted and occasionally fought with and raided other tribes. The women tanned and dressed hides for clothing, shelter, and other uses. They also gathered roots, berries, and other useful plants. From the products of hunting and gathering, the women also made lodges, clothing, and other equipment. Their lives were active and physically demanding. The Cheyenne held territory in and near the Black Hills, but later all the Great Plains from Dakota to the Arkansas River.

Role models
A Cheyenne woman has a higher status if she is part of an extended family with distinguished ancestors. Also, if she is friendly and compatible with her female relatives and does not have members in her extended family who are alcoholics or otherwise in disrepute. It is expected of all Cheyenne women to be hardworking, chaste, modest, skilled in traditional crafts, knowledgeable about Cheyenne culture and history and speak Cheyenne fluently. Tribal powwow princesses are expected to have these characteristics.

Ethnobotany
An infusion of the pulverized leaves and blossoms of tansy is used for dizziness and weakness. They give dried leaves of Sagittaria cuneata to horses for urinary troubles and for a sore mouth.

Notable historic Cheyenne people
Please list 20th and 21st-century Cheyenne people under their specific tribes, Cheyenne and Arapaho Tribes and Northern Cheyenne Tribe of the Northern Cheyenne Indian Reservation.
 George Bent (1843–1918), son of Owl Woman, interpreter and Cheyenne historian
 Black Kettle (c. 1803–1868) (in Cheyenne: Moke-tav-a-to or Mo'ôhtavetoo'o, since 1854 member of the Council of Forty-four and chief of the Wotapio band of Southern Cheyenne, killed by George Armstrong Custer at Battle of Washita River)
 Morning Star (1810–1883) (in Cheyenne: Vóóhéhéve, better known as Dull Knife, a translation of his Lakota name Tamílapéšni, Head chief of the Northern Cheyenne)
 Little Wolf (ca. 1820–1904) (in Cheyenne: Ó'kôhómôxháahketa, more correctly translated Little Coyote, Northern Só'taeo'o chief and Sweet Medicine Chief, was one of the "Old Man" chiefs among the Council of Forty-four, belonged to the Elk Horn Scrapers (Hémo'eoxeso), one of the four original Cheyenne military societies)
 St. David Pendleton Oakerhater, Okuhhatuh or "Making Medicine," Southern Cheyenne (1847–1931), veteran of the Red River War, Fort Marion prisoner of war, ledger artist, deacon of Whirlwind Mission, sun dancer, canonized saint in the Episcopal Church
 Owl Woman (d. 1847), daughter of White Thunder and wife of William Bent
 Roman Nose (in Cheyenne: Woo-ka-nay, Northern Cheyenne, legendary war hero and chief of the Elk Horn Scrapers (Hémo'eoxeso), one of the four original Cheyenne military societies)
 Tall Bull, chief of the Cheyenne Dog Soldiers, killed at Battle of Summit Springs
 Two Moons, Northern Cheyenne Chief, in Cheyenne: Éše'he Ȯhnéšesėstse, also known as Ónonevóo'xénéhe (Ree Roman Nose) or Mȧsėhávoo'xénéhe (Crazy Roman Nose)
 Wooden Leg, Northern Cheyenne, warrior fought at Little Bighorn
 Wolf Robe, chief, Southern Cheyenne, peacemaker

See also
 Cheyenne and Arapaho Tribes
 Native American tribes in Nebraska
 The Cheyenne Indians: Their History and Lifeways

Notes

Further reading
 Ambler, Marjane; Little Bear, Richard E; et al. (2008) We, The Northern Cheyenne People. Lame Deer, MT: Chief Dull Knife College
 Berthrong, Donald J. The Southern Cheyenne. Norman: University of Oklahoma Press, 1963. 
 Brown, Dee. Bury My Heart at Wounded Knee. New York: Holt, Rinehart and Winston, 1970. .
 Bourke, John G. Mackenzie's Last Fight with the Cheyenne. New York: Argonaut Press, 1966.
 Greene, Jerome A. (2004). Washita, The Southern Cheyenne and the U.S. Army. Campaigns and Commanders Series, vol. 3. Norman: University of Oklahoma Press, p. 9 
 Grinnell, George Bird. The Fighting Cheyenne. Norman: University of Oklahoma Press, 1956. (original copyright 1915, NY: Charles Scribner's Sons). .
 Grinnell, George Bird. The Cheyenne Indians: Their History and Ways of Life. New Haven, CT: Yale University Press, 1923. 2 volumes; trade paperback, reprints: The Cheyenne Indians, Vol. 1: History and Society, Bison Books, 1972. ; The Cheyenne Indians, Vol. 2: War, Ceremonies, and Religion, Bison Books, 1972. .
 Hill, Christina Gish (2016). Webs of Kinship: Family in Northern Cheyenne Nationhood. Norman, OK: University of Oklahoma Press.
 Hyde, George E. Life of George Bent: Written From His Letters, ed. Savoie Lottinville, Norman: University of Oklahoma Press, 1968. Reprint, trade paperback,  1983. 
 
 
 Pritzker, Barry M. [ [...]A Native American Encyclopedia: History, Culture, and Peoples.] Oxford: Oxford University Press, 2000. .

External links

 Map of Lakota-Sioux and Cheyenne War on Central Plains in 1866–1876
 "Cheyenne Culture and History Links", Native Languages
 
 Jomay Steen, "Indian remains finally at rest", The Rapid City Journal, 31 March 2005
 "Cheyenne perform Victory Dance to honor Marine tank driver", Turtle Track
 
 
 
 

Algonquian peoples
Great Sioux War of 1876
 
Comanche campaign
Plains tribes
Cheyenne people
Native American tribes in Colorado
Native American tribes in Montana
Native American tribes in Wyoming
Native American tribes in Nebraska
Native American tribes in Kansas